Katie Fforde, née Catherine Rose Gordon-Cumming (born 27 September 1952), is a British romance novelist. Published since 1995, her romance novels are set in modern-day England.

She is founder of the Katie Fforde Bursary for writers who have yet to secure a publishing contract. She was for many years a committee member of the Romantic Novelists' Association and was elected its twenty-fifth chairman (2009–2011) and later its fourth president. In June 2010 she was announced as a patron of the UK's first National Short Story Week. In 2016, she launched the Stroud Contemporary Fiction Writing Competition as part of the first Stroud Book Festival.

Biography
Catherine Rose Gordon-Cumming was born on 27 September 1952 in Wimbledon, London, the daughter of Shirley Barbara Laub and Michael Willoughby Gordon-Cumming. Her grandfather was Sir William Gordon-Cumming. Her sister is fellow writer Jane Gordon-Cumming.

In 1972, she married Desmond Fforde, the nephew of banker John Standish Fforde and cousin of fellow writer Jasper Fforde. She has three children: Guy, Francis and Briony, and did not start writing until after the birth of her third child. She writes under her married name.

Fforde has lived near Stroud, Gloucestershire for over twenty years.

Many of Fforde's own experiences end up in her books. Her novel Going Dutch was a Sunday Times top ten bestseller in June 2007. Fforde takes the research for her books seriously, employing a 'method acting'-style approach to the different professions and backgrounds featured in her novels, using experiences such as being a porter in an auction house, making pottery, refurbishing furniture, examining the processes behind a dating website, and going on a Ray Mears survival course.

Bibliography
Fforde is the author of a number of works.

Novels
Living Dangerously (1995)
The Rose Revived (1995)
Wild Designs (1996)
Stately Pursuits (1997)
Life Skills (1999)
Thyme Out (2000) aka Second Thyme Around
Artistic Licence (2001)
Highland Fling (2002)
Paradise Fields (2003)
Restoring Grace (2004)
Flora's Lot (2005)  Bidding for Love
Practically Perfect (2006)
Going Dutch (2007)
Wedding Season (2008)
Love Letters (2009)
A Perfect Proposal (2010)
Summer of Love (2011)
The Undercover Cook (2012)
Recipe for Love (2012)
Best of Romance (2012)
Staying Away at Christmas (2012)
A French Affair (2013)
The Perfect Match (2014)
A Vintage Wedding (2015)
Christmas like in a Picture Book (2016)
A Summer at Sea (2016)
Candlelight at Christmas (2016)
Winter Collection (2016)
Meeting for Christmas (2016)
Christmas in the Distance (2016)
Christmas by the Fire (2016)
A Secret Garden (2017)
A Summer by the Sea: can you be a girlfriend on vacation? (2017)
A Country Escape (2018)
A Summer by the Sea (2018)
A Garden full of Flowers (2018)
A Rose Petal Summer (2019)
The Cottage (2019)
Country House with Views / A Love in the Highlands (2019)
Christmas Magic in the Cabin (2019)
A Springtime Affair (2020)
A Wedding in the Country (2021)
A Wedding in Provence (2022)

Anthologies edited
Loves Me, Loves Me Not (2009)
A Christmas Feast and Other Stories (2014)
The Christmas Stocking and Other Stories (2017)

Forewords
"Wannabe a Writer?" (Accent Press 2007, Jane Wenham-Jones)

Filmography 
Fforde's  have been adapted into a series of German TV films. Unlike the novels, the TV films are shot in the Northeastern United States.
Katie Fforde:  (2008)
Katie Fforde:  (2010, based on Highland Fling)
Katie Fforde:  (2010, based on Restoring Grace)
Katie Fforde:  (2010, based on Thyme Out)
Katie Fforde:  (2011, based on The Rose Revived)
Katie Fforde:  (2011, based on Living Dangerously)
 (2012)
 (2012)
 (2012)
 (2012)
 (2012)
Katie Fforde: An Expensive Fling (2013, based on Flora's Lot)
 (2014)
 (2014)
Katie Fforde: Like Fire and Ice (2014)
Katie Fforde:  (2014, based on Paradise Fields)
 (2014)
 (2014)
 (2015)
 (2015)
Katie Fforde: The Child I Long For (2015)
Katie Fforde: A Christmas Miracle in New York (2015)
 (2016)
Katie Fforde:  (2016)
 (2016)
 (2016)
 (2016)
 (2016)
 (2016)
 (2016)
 (2017)
Katie Fforde: My Crazy Family (2017)
 (2017)
 (2018)
 (2018)
 (2018)
Katie Fforde: A Friend in Need (2018)
Katie Fforde: Room with an Ocean View (2018)
Katie Fforde: Kissed Awake (2019)
Katie Fforde: The Other Woman's Child (2019)

References

External links 
 https://www.independent.co.uk/arts-entertainment/books-restoring-grace-by-katie-fforde-1528675.html
 https://www.isis-publishing.co.uk/author/f/katie-fforde
 http://stroudfestival.org/comp.html

English romantic fiction writers
1952 births
Living people
People from Wimbledon, London
Writers from London
People from Stroud